The Emerald Coast XL2 Sport is an American powered parachute that was designed and produced by Emerald Coast Aircraft.

The aircraft is no longer in production.

Design and development
The aircraft was designed as a US FAR 103 Ultralight Vehicles two-seat trainer. It features a parachute-style high-wing, two seats in tandem, tricycle landing gear and a single  Rotax 503 engine in pusher configuration.

The aircraft is built from a combination of bolted and welded 4130 steel tubing. In flight steering is accomplished via foot pedals that actuate the canopy brakes via a 2:1 ratio block system, creating roll and yaw. On the ground the aircraft has lever-controlled nosewheel steering. The main landing gear incorporates sprung steel landing gear with large tundra tires.

When it was in production the XL2 was supplied in a number of forms. It could be purchased as a fully assembled and test flown aircraft, for US$9000 in 2003. It was also available as a just the basic carriage for US$3000 in 2003, with the buyer supplying his or her own canopy, instruments, engine and propeller. The company also built custom versions to order.

Specifications (XL2 Sport)

References

2000s United States ultralight aircraft
Single-engined pusher aircraft
Powered parachutes